Achnasheen (Gaelic Achadh na Sìne) is a small village in Ross-shire in the Highland council area of Scotland.

The village is situated on the River Bran at the junction of two roads built by Thomas Telford.

Despite the size of the village, Achnasheen is also the name of a postal district which covers several much larger communities including Kinlochewe, Poolewe and Laide. This dates from the time when the village railway station, built in 1870, was an important stop on the Kyle of Lochalsh Line, serving a large area of Wester Ross. The railway still operates but all freight and mail, and most passengers, now travel by road.  In 1893, a scheme was considered to build a railway from Achnasheen to Aultbea, but it was soon dropped.

Facilities in the village are limited. The Ledgowan Lodge Hotel is a mile west of the village, but the Achnasheen Hotel (by the railway station) burnt down in the early 1990s and has never been rebuilt.

Between 1961 and 1991, the village was the location of a Royal Observer Corps monitoring bunker, to be used in the event of a nuclear attack. It remains mostly intact.

Cultural references
Symphonic power metal band Gloryhammer mentioned the 'valley of Achnasheen' and the 'seas of Achnasheen' in their 2019 songs "The Land of Unicorns" and "Hootsforce" respectively.

References

External links

Populated places in Ross and Cromarty